The Pullman was an American automobile manufactured in York, Pennsylvania by the York Motor Car Company from 1905 to 1909 and the Pullman Motor Car Company from 1909 to 1917.  The Pullman automobile was named by industrialist Albert P. Broomell to reflect the quality and luxury of rail cars and coaches made by the Pullman Company, but the two organizations were not related.

History

Six-wheeled Pullman 
Albert P. Brumell of Broomell, Schmidt & Steacy Company built his first car called a Pullman in 1903 which featured six wheels.  Built in the Hardinge factory, the axles were evenly spaced, so that while the endmost two axles were in their conventional fore and aft locations, the middle two wheels were the powered wheels and sat directly under the passenger seats.  When the car reached a particularly high spot in the road, it had a tendency to see-saw.  The Pullman was involved in a car crash in 1903. The vehicle was torn apart and items such as the engine were rebuilt in a more conventional four-wheel configuration.

Pullman Motor Car 
The revised car was thought to be good enough for production and Brunnell and Samuel E. Baily established the York Motor Car Company in 1905.  Also in 1905, master mechanic James A. Kline joined to design an improved car.  Originally planned to be called the York, Pullman was settled on before the new car went into production. 13 York pilot cars were built in 1905 growing to 273 Pullmans in 1906, the first full year of production.

Pullman automobiles were sold as premium vehicles, using advertising slogans such as "Not Only The Best at the Price, But the Best at Any Price." The first Pullmans were large Touring and Runabout cars with 20-hp or 40-hp engines priced from $2,000 to $2,500, .  By 1909 annual production exceeded 1,000 cars and doubled in 1910 to over 2,000.

Due to the Panic of 1907, financial assistance was needed and Thomas O'Connor and Oscar Stephenson of New York City became investors. In 1908 James Kline and Samuel Baily departed the company and would go back into automobile production with the Kline Kar in 1910.   In 1908, one vehicle was driven from the York factory to San Francisco and back over a period of about a month to prove its reliability. The Lincoln Highway which ran through York had not been fully organized or completed and this was a challenging journey.  In 1909 the company was reorganized as the Pullman Motor Car Company.

A Pullman won the famed Fairmount Park Road Race in Philadelphia in 1910, and in 1911 was awarded three gold medals at the Russian Exposition in Rostov on Don, considered an unprecedented "victory" for an American automobile manufacturer.  In 1912 Pullman introduced a 60-hp six-cylinder car on a 138-inch wheelbase priced at $2,750, .

Annual production by 1915 was over 4,000 cars and the Cutler-Hammer electric gear change was offered.  However, quality issues resulted from the high production and sales severely declined.  In late 1915, E. T. Birdsall was brought in from White Motor Company to design a lower priced car to be called the Pullman Junior, but it was too late to save the company.  The Pullman Junior with a 22-hp Golden Belknap & Schwartz engine priced at $740 was introduced for 1916 and was the only car produced in 1917 under receivership.

Fate
Pullman Motor Car Company declared bankruptcy in December 1916 and ceased operations in 1917 and the company assets were sold that July. The original building which housed the Pullman factory still exists in York, Pennsylvania at 701 Hay Street currently owned by Hay Street LLC.  There are about 27 known Pullman automobiles still in existence, about half of which have been restored.

Gallery

See also 
 New York Times story on new cars for 1909
 Pullman automobiles at ConceptCarz

References

Defunct motor vehicle manufacturers of the United States
Economic history of Pennsylvania
Brass Era vehicles
1900s cars
1910s cars
Motor vehicle manufacturers based in Pennsylvania
Cars introduced in 1905
Vehicle manufacturing companies established in 1905
Vehicle manufacturing companies disestablished in 1917